Erika Burgess (born 1 October 1984 in New Plymouth, New Zealand) is a New Zealand netball player. Burgess plays for the Southern Steel in the ANZ Championship, having previously played for the Western Flyers (2003–06) and Southern Sting (2007) in the National Bank Cup. A former member of the New Zealand A squad, Burgess made the extended training squad for the Silver Ferns, although has yet to make it into the senior team.

References

External links
 2010 Southern Steel profile
 2010 ANZ Championship profile

New Zealand netball players
Southern Steel players
ANZ Championship players
Sportspeople from New Plymouth
Living people
1984 births
Western Flyers players
Southern Sting players